Fabryka Broni "Łucznik" – Radom—also known as Fabryka Broni Radom  or Zakłady Metalowe "Łucznik"—is a Polish defence industry enterprise from Radom that produces firearms. The enterprise is a part of Polska Grupa Zbrojeniowa SA.

In the past it used to produce non-military equipment, most notably sewing machines and typewriters, but those branches were deemed unprofitable and were dropped in 2000.

History

The company was founded in the Second Polish Republic to produce arms for Wojsko Polskie.

In 1925 the main building, steel hardening shop, power plant, boiler room, woodshop, bath, and the workers’ houses were erected. On 31 December 1927, production was launched when, by an act signed by then Director of the plant Msc.Eng. Kazimierz Ołdakowski, the plant was officially taken over from the local government and became part of the Państwowe Wytwórnie Uzbrojenia concern. Ołdakowski insisted that his workers receive free health care.  He also arranged for child care services and regular leisure time, and built gymnasiums, theaters, gardens, and housing for his workers. During his directorship the Vis pistol (pistolet wz. 35 Vis) was developed.

During World War II it was captured and operated by the Germans.

After World War II the factory was renamed: Zakłady Metalowe im. gen. "Waltera" (General Walter Metal Works). It received the factory code number of 11; to prevent confusion with an earlier Factory #11, the number received a single circle around it to differentiate it. In 1990 the factory returned to its old name Zakłady Metalowe "Łucznik" (Metal Works "Łucznik"), "łucznik" meaning 'archer'. It became a state-owned company (SA). On 13 November 2000 the company was declared bankrupt, however, on 30 June 2000 a company Fabryka Broni "Łucznik" – Radom (Arms Factory Łucznik – Radom) was created by ZM Łucznik and the Industry Development Agency, which took over arms production.

Products

Original designs
 FB MSBS – 5.56 mm modular assault rifle (in production, 7.62S/N versions in development), adopted by Polish armed forces as Grot
 FB Beryl M762 – 7.62 mm assault rifle (in production)—basically AKM (7,62x39 cartridge, same barrel length) with Beryl features—around 2000 delivered to Nigeria, civil variant available
 FB Mini-Beryl – 5.56 mm carbine (in production)
 FB Beryl – 5.56 mm assault rifle (in production)
 FB Onyks – 5.45 mm carbine
 FB Tantal – 5.45 mm assault rifle
 Radom Sport – Beryl derivative for civilian market
 Radom Hunter – AKM derivative for civilian market
 FB Glauberyt – 9 mm submachine gun (in production)
 FB PM-63 – 9 mm Makarov submachine gun
 FB Vis 100 "Ragun" – 9 mm pistol (in development)
 FB MAG – 9 mm pistol
 FB Wanad – 9 mm Makarov pistol
 FB P-64 – 9 mm Makarov pistol
 FB Vis '35 – 9 mm pistol
 wz. 44 – 26.5mm flare pistol
 wz. 78 – 26.5mm flare pistol

Licensed weapons
 Walther PPS pistol (in production)
 Walther P99 pistol (in production) 
 Mosin–Nagant (1951–1955)
 PW wz.33 (1947–1956) 7,62x25mm TT-33 pistol
 PPSh-41 (1951–1953?)
 PPS-43 and PPS-43/52 (1951–1955)
 AK-47 and AKM (1957–1992, 1997–2000)
 DP-28 and DPM (1952–1955)
 RPD (1958–1961)
 Kbk wz. 29 (1930–1939) Gewehr 98 derivative
 Kb wz. 98a (1936–1939) Gewehr 98 derivative

See also
 Państwowa Fabryka Karabinów

Explanatory notes

References

External links 

 

Firearm manufacturers of Poland
Defence companies of Poland
Manufacturing companies of Poland
Manufacturing companies established in 1922
1922 establishments in Poland
Polish brands
Radom
Polish Limited Liability Companies